Occitan nationalism is a social and political movement in Occitania. Nationalists seek self-determination, greater autonomy or the creation of a sovereign state of Occitania. The basis of nationalism is linguistic and cultural although currently the Occitan varieties are minority languages within the language area.

The territories claimed under the Occitan nation represent a large part of southern France, Monaco, parts of Spain (Val d'Aran), and Italy (Occitan Valleys, Guardia Piemontese).

Occitan nationalism in recent years

Occitan nationalism re-appears as a reaction of injustice in the regions of southern France in the face of the economic and energy restructuring undertaken by the Gaullists ruling in the 1960s, which gave priority to the most prosperous regions of the northern country. In 1962, the French government decided in a completely arbitrary way to close the mining and industrial complex of La Sala, a fact which then became regarded as the catalyst of the modern Occitan claims.

Then, from 1968, Occitan cultural rebirth combined with economic protest led to a nationalist claim that Occitania was an inner colony of the centralist French state. Although there was an Occitan nationalist current, the unionism with the leftist French won. This is why Lucha Occitana defines Occitania as a popular nationality, that is to say as a nation in the making. Lucha Occitana objected, ideologically speaking, to the nationalism of the Partit de la Nacion Occitana: the Occitan nation being a starting point for the Partit de la Nacion Occitana, then it was a point of arrival for Lucha Occitana.

From the 1973 oil crisis, the evolution of the international economic situation will change the game for several decades. The economic crisis that followed the end of Trente Glorieuses will affect all France. In the same way as the other nationalist movements of the rest of the France and Europe, the core of the claims focused on cultural identity and right of minorities.

The Occitan nationalism of the 1980s lost its influence on society mainly because of the fragmentation of parties and organizations between different ideologies, as well as the inability to articulate a romantic nationalism covering such a large territory with a heterogeneous social reality.

In the 1990s, the political movement could be described as marginal within Occitanism.

Recently Occitan nationalism is renewed, we can mention:
 the creation of new movements such as Freedom ! (Libertat !), resulting from a merger of several occitanist extreme left movements.
 the symbolic creation of the Occitan Provisional Government supported by three Occitanist parties.
 the networking of Occitanist politicians with the nationalists and regionalists of France and the European Union.
 alliances with French national parties that allowed the election of Occitanist regional councilors to the 2010 French Regional Elections.
 The text of the law for the recognition of the  Occitan national reality of Val d'Aran in Spain.
 The birth of the Bastir! political movement that is running in the 2014 French Municipal Elections in several French municipalities of all sizes. Bastir! bridges the gap between cultural and political currents by bringing together Occitanist candidates of various political tendencies.
 The presentation of a nationalist list "Occitania for a Europe of the Peoples" in the South-West France constituency at 2014 European Parliament elections.

Moreover, the linguistic aspect is one of the most important claims of Occitan nationalism, as well as "Occitan regionalism" and various civic movements in Occitania. In this area, many political advances on the recognition of Occitan language have recently resulted. We can cite:
 Obtaining the status of protected linguistic minority in Italy in 1999.
 The events focused on the defense of Occitan since 2005 in France.
 The officialization of Occitan throughout Catalonia (Spain) in 2006, reinforced by a law adopted in 2010.
 Recognitions as language of the department in the Pyrénées-Orientales in 2007, and language of the region in Rhône-Alpes in 2009.
 The various initiatives for the language of Aquitaine, Midi-Pyrénées, Languedoc-Roussillon and Provence-Alpes-Côte d'Azur regions.
 The treatment of Occitan claims at the level of the European Parliament on 22 November 2012.

Territorial claims
The following table shows the size and population of the territories claimed by the Occitan nationalism is as follows:

Political parties
 Occitan Party
 Occitan Nation Party – Partit de la Nacion Occitana (PNO)
 Anaram Au Patac
 Iniciativa Per Occitània
 Paratge
 Occitan Republican Left
 Unitat d'Òc
 Lucha Occitana
 Corròp
 Unitat d'Aran
 Aranese Democratic Convergence
 Bastir!
 Freedom ! (Libertat !)
 Assemblada Occitana (Occitan Assembly)

See also
 Occitania
 European Free Alliance
 Basque nationalism
 Catalan nationalism
 Sicilian nationalism

References